The Antranik Youth Association (AYA), or simply Antranik, is a Lebanese-Armenian multi-sports and cultural club based in Antelias, Matn District, Lebanon. Established in Beirut, Lebanon in 1931, it has consisted of various sports departments throughout their history, including basketball, football, cycling, tennis, taekwondo, chess, table tennis, and athletics.

Named after the Armenian military commander Antranik Ozanian, Antranik is the Lebanese section of the Armenian Youth Association (AYA), the sports, cultural, and youth program of the Armenian General Benevolent Union (AGBU). Antranik has branches in Beirut, Antelias, Zahlé, Sin el Fil, and Bourj Hammoud.

Basketball

Founded in 1987, Antranik's men's basketball team have participated multiple times in the Lebanese Basketball League. The women's team have won the league 10 times in a row, between 2002 and 2012, and have been crowned champions of the Arab Women's Club Basketball Championship twice.

Football

Antranik formed its football team in 1931; they were one of the Lebanese Football Association's founding members in 1933. The first team participated in the Lebanese Premier League during the 1930s and 1940s, while their reserve team played in the Lebanese Second Division, winning it in 1940–41.

Other activities
The Lebanese chapter of Antranik also runs numerous cultural activities including its own theatrical group, the Troupe Vahram Papazian, named after the pan-Armenian actor Vahram Papazian. They also run a programme in scouting.

References

External links
 

Antranik Youth Association
Sport in Beirut
1931 establishments in Lebanon
Tennis teams
Armenian-Lebanese culture
Scouting and Guiding in Lebanon
Diaspora sports clubs